Thomas Bolger may refer to:
 Thomas Bolger (Irish politician) (1882–1938),  Irish Cumann na nGaedheal politician
 Thomas A. Bolger (1887–1953), American politician from Illinois 
 Thomas Bolger (wrestler) (1904–1995), Australian wrestler